Anna Grudko (born 9 February 1990) is a retired Russian artistic gymnast. She is the 2006 European champion on vault, and a member of the Russian team at the 2006 World Championships that won the bronze medal. Additionally, she won bronze at the 2006 European Championships with the Russian team and at the 2007 European Championships on vault.

References 

1990 births
Living people
Russian female artistic gymnasts
Medalists at the World Artistic Gymnastics Championships
People from Severodvinsk
European champions in gymnastics
Sportspeople from Arkhangelsk Oblast